Cecily April Adams (February 6, 1958 – March 3, 2004) was an American actress, casting director, and lyricist.

Early life
Adams was born in Jamaica, Queens, New York City, the daughter of comic actor Don Adams and singer Adelaide Efantis. Her siblings included her brother Sean, and her sisters Carolyn Steele, Christine Adams, Cathy Metchik, Paramount TV executive Stacey Adams and Beige Adams. She attended Beverly Hills High School, where she participated in acting, an activity she continued at the University of California at Irvine.

Career
Adams studied improvisational comedy at the Groundlings and was a member of the Acme Comedy Theater in Los Angeles. She was also an acting coach.

Adams portrayed the recurring character of Ishka (also known as "Moogie"), mother of the Ferengi brothers Rom and Quark, in four of her five appearances in the television series Star Trek: Deep Space Nine, replacing Andrea Martin. Adams was, in fact, nine years younger than Armin Shimerman, who played Quark, despite playing his mother.

She appeared in guest roles on a variety of television series, including Just Shoot Me!, Murphy Brown, and Party of Five, and with her father in his television series Check It Out! and television movie Get Smart Again. Adams played a lead role in the 1991 independent feature film Little Secrets.

Adams was also a lyricist, and with her collaborator, David Burke wrote pop songs and commercial jingles and television theme songs.

Adams worked in casting TV series such as 3rd Rock From the Sun and Eerie, Indiana, and features including American Heart (1992) and Home Room (2002). Until her death, she served as casting director for That '70s Show.

Personal life
Adams married actor/writer Jim Beaver in 1989; their daughter was born in 2001. Adams, though a non-smoker, died of lung cancer on March 3, 2004, at the age of 46, in Los Angeles, California. Her husband's memoir, Life's That Way, details her last few months. She was cremated and her ashes scattered at Fern Canyon in Prairie Creek Redwoods State Park, California, and at Franklin Canyon Park in Beverly Hills, California.

Filmography

Film
Little Secrets (actress, casting director)
American Heart (casting director)
Who Framed Roger Rabbit (casting assistant)

Television
That 70s Show (casting director)
Just Shoot Me! (actress)
3rd Rock from the Sun (casting director)
Star Trek: Deep Space Nine (actress)
Murder One (actress)
Party of Five (actress)
That 80s Show (casting director)
Eerie, Indiana (casting director)
Total Recall 2070 (actress)
Murphy Brown (actress)
Home Improvement (actress)
Melrose Place (actress)
The Equalizer (actress)
Check It Out! (actress)
Quincy, M.E. (actress)
Simon & Simon (actress)
 1999 - Get Smart, Again! - Customer (bit part)

Deep Space Nine appearances
 "Family Business"
 "Ferengi Love Songs"
 "The Magnificent Ferengi"
 "Profit and Lace"
 "The Dogs of War"
 "What You Leave Behind" (unbilled cameo, series finale)

References

External links
 
 

1958 births
2004 deaths
20th-century American actresses
Actresses from New York City
American people of Hungarian-Jewish descent
American television actresses
Deaths from lung cancer in California
American casting directors
Women casting directors
People from Jamaica, Queens
University of California, Irvine alumni
21st-century American actresses